The 2010 WNBA season was the 5th season for the Chicago Sky of the Women's National Basketball Association. This was the first season for the Sky in Allstate Arena. The Sky previously played at UIC Pavilion.

Transactions

Sacramento Monarchs Dispersal Draft
With the Sacramento Monarchs ceasing operation and based on the 2009 records of teams, the Sky selected 4th in the Dispersal Draft.

WNBA Draft

Trades and Roster Changes

Roster
{| class="toccolours" style="font-size: 95%; width: 100%;"
|-
! colspan="2"  style="background:#4b90cc; color:#Fbb726"|2010 Chicago Sky Roster
|- style="text-align:center; background-color:#Fbb726; color:#FFFFFF;"
! Players !! Coaches
|- 
| valign="top" |
{| class="sortable" style="background:transparent; margin:0px; width:100%;"
! Pos. !! # !! Nat. !! Name !! Ht. !! Wt. !! From
|-

Depth

Schedule

Preseason

|- align="center" bgcolor="bbffbb"
| 1 || April 30 || 1:00pm || @ Minnesota || 87-78 || Tamera Young (18) || Mistie Bass (7) || Sami Whitcomb (5) || Concordia University  633 || 1-0
|- align="center" bgcolor="bbffbb"
| 2 || May 6 || 12:30pm || Minnesota || 74-65 || Catherine Kraayeveld (20) || BassKraayeveldIrvin (6) || Dominique Canty (6) || Allstate Arena  N/A || 2-0
|- align="center" bgcolor="ffbbbb"
| 3 || May 7 || 12:00pm || @ Indiana || 63-69 || Kristi Toliver (14) || Mistie Bass (8) || Mistie Bass (2) || Conseco Fieldhouse  7,291 || 2-1
|- align="center" bgcolor="bbffbb"
| 4 || May 10 || 12:30pm || Indiana || 84-71 || Sylvia Fowles (13) || Sylvia Fowles (7) || Dominique Canty (6) || Allstate Arena  N/A || 3-1
|-

Regular Season

|- align="center" bgcolor="ffbbbb"
| 1 || May 15 || 3:30pm || @ Connecticut || CN100 || 61-74 || Sylvia Fowles (16) || Sylvia Fowles (9) || Shameka Christon (4) || Mohegan Sun Arena  8,072 || 0-1
|- align="center" bgcolor="ffbbbb"
| 2 || May 16 || 4:00pm || @ New York || NBATVCN100MSG || 82-85 || Sylvia Fowles (23) || Dominique Canty (8) || Dominique Canty (5) || Madison Square Garden  12,088 || 0-2
|- align="center" bgcolor="ffbbbb"
| 3 || May 22 || 8:00pm || Indiana || CN100 || 86-92 (OT) || Sylvia Fowles (22) || Sylvia Fowles (12) || Dominique Canty (5) || Allstate Arena  6,477 || 0-3
|- align="center" bgcolor="ffbbbb"
| 4 || May 23 || 6:00pm || @ Indiana || CN100FS-I || 61-69 || Catherine Kraayeveld (11) || Sylvia Fowles (9) || FowlesKraayeveld (2) || Conseco Fieldhouse  7,665 || 0-4
|- align="center" bgcolor="bbffbb"
| 5 || May 27 || 8:00pm || Seattle || CN100 || 84-75 || Sylvia Fowles (19) || Sylvia Fowles (8) || Dominique Canty (4) || Allstate Arena  2,923 || 1-4
|- align="center" bgcolor="bbffbb"
| 6 || May 29 || 8:00pm || @ Minnesota || CN100 || 73-58 || Sylvia Fowles (18) || Mistie Bass (6) || CantyPrince (4) || Target Center  6,129 || 2-4
|-

|- align="center" bgcolor="bbffbb"
| 7 || June 4 || 7:00pm || @ Atlanta || CN100FS-S || 80-70 || Sylvia Fowles (19) || Sylvia Fowles (9) || Shameka Christon (8) || Philips Arena  2,515 || 3-4
|- align="center" bgcolor="bbffbb"
| 8 || June 5 || 8:00pm || Tulsa || CN100 || 95-70 || Sylvia Fowles (32) || Sylvia Fowles (13) || Dominique Canty (6) || Allstate Arena  4,549 || 4-4
|- align="center" bgcolor="ffbbbb"
| 9 || June 8 || 8:00pm || New York || CN100 || 70-85 || Epiphanny Prince (20) || Sylvia Fowles (6) || ChristonYoungPrinceThorn (3) || Allstate Arena  2,408 || 4-5
|- align="center" bgcolor="ffbbbb"
| 10 || June 11 || 8:30pm || Washington || CN100 || 78-95 || Sylvia Fowles (23) || Sylvia Fowles (7) || CantyPerkinsThorn (4) || Allstate Arena  3,107 || 4-6
|- align="center" bgcolor="ffbbbb"
| 11 || June 15 || 8:00pm || Atlanta || CN100 || 86-93 || Jia Perkins (25) || Tamera Young (7) || Dominique Canty (6) || Allstate Arena  3,292 || 4-7
|- align="center" bgcolor="ffbbbb"
| 12 || June 19 || 7:00pm || @ Washington || NBATVCN100CSN-MA || 61-65 (OT) || Sylvia Fowles (17) || Sylvia Fowles (9) || Jia Perkins (4) || Verizon Center  9,034 || 4-8
|- align="center" bgcolor="bbffbb"
| 13 || June 22 || 7:30pm || @ Connecticut || CN100 || 86-77 || Epiphanny Prince (19) || Sylvia Fowles (9) || PrinceYoung (4) || Mohegan Sun Arena  6,987 || 5-8
|- align="center" bgcolor="bbffbb"
| 14 || June 25 || 8:30pm || Washington || CN100 || 79-72 || Jia Perkins (20) || Sylvia Fowles (7) || Dominique Canty (4) || Allstate Arena  3,419 || 6-8
|- align="center" bgcolor="ffbbbb"
| 15 || June 27 || 6:00pm || Indiana || CN100 || 70-64 || Erin Thorn (15) || Sylvia Fowles (17) || PrinceThorn (3) || Allstate Arena  4,051 || 6-9
|-

|- align="center" bgcolor="bbffbb"
| 16 || July 1 || 8:00pm || Connecticut || CN100 || 92-80 || Sylvia Fowles (26) || Sylvia Fowles (11) || BassCanty (5) || Allstate Arena  3,061 || 7-9
|- align="center" bgcolor="bbffbb"
| 17 || July 3 || 7:00pm || @ Atlanta || NBATVCN100SSO || 88-82 || Sylvia Fowles (22) || Sylvia Fowles (12) || CantyThornYoung (2) || Philips Arena  6,920 || 8-9
|- align="center" bgcolor="ffbbbb"
| 18 || July 6 || 8:00pm || Indiana || CN100 || 51-58 || Sylvia Fowles (26) || Sylvia Fowles (18) || Epiphanny Prince (4) || Allstate Arena  3,732 || 8-10
|- align="center" bgcolor="ffbbbb"
| 19 || July 11 || 4:00pm || @ New York || MSG || 54-57 || Jia Perkins (26) || Sylvia Fowles (19) || Sylvia Fowles (3) || Madison Square Garden  9,644 || 8-11
|- align="center" bgcolor="bbffbb"
| 20 || July 14 || 12:30pm || San Antonio || CN100 || 88-61 || FowlesPerkinsPrince (14) || Mistie Bass (7) || CantyPrince (5) || Allstate Arena  6,950 || 9-11
|- align="center" bgcolor="bbffbb"
| 21 || July 16 || 8:30pm || Los Angeles || CN100 || 80-68 || Erin Thorn (15) || Sylvia Fowles (10) || Dominique Canty (6) || Allstate Arena  4,841 || 10-11
|- align="center" bgcolor="bbffbb"
| 22 || July 18 || 4:00pm || @ Washington || CSN-MA || 61-59 || Sylvia Fowles (13) || Sylvia Fowles (11) || FowlesKraayeveldThorn (3) || Verizon Center  8,790 || 11-11
|- align="center" bgcolor="ffbbbb"
| 23 || July 23 || 8:30pm || New York || CN100 || 71-79 || Epiphanny Prince (14) || Sylvia Fowles (16) || Dominique Canty (6) || Allstate Arena  5,256 || 11-12
|- align="center" bgcolor="bbffbb"
| 24 || July 24 || 8:00pm || @ San Antonio || CN100 || 75-72 || Sylvia Fowles (23) || Sylvia Fowles (12) || Dominique Canty (6) || AT&T Center  8,999 || 12-12
|- align="center" bgcolor="ffbbbb"
| 25 || July 27 || 7:00pm || @ Indiana || CN100 || 74-78 || Sylvia Fowles (18) || Sylvia Fowles (8) || ThornYoung (4) || Conseco Fieldhouse  6,853 || 12-13
|- align="center" bgcolor="ffbbbb"
| 26 || July 30 || 10:00pm || @ Seattle || NBATVKONG || 60-80 || Sylvia Fowles (13) || Mistie Bass (7) || Sylvia Fowles (5) || KeyArena  7,749 || 12-14
|-

|- align="center" bgcolor="ffbbbb"
| 27 || August 1 || 6:00pm || @ Phoenix || NBATVCN100FS-A || 96-97 || Sylvia Fowles (35) || Sylvia Fowles (8) || Epiphanny Prince (5) || US Airways Center  11,237 || 12-15
|- align="center" bgcolor="ffbbbb"
| 28 || August 4 || 10:30pm || @ Los Angeles || NBATVCN100 || 77-82 || Jia Perkins (16) || Sylvia Fowles (11) || CantyPerkins (4) || STAPLES Center  9,732 || 12-16
|- align="center" bgcolor="ffbbbb"
| 29 || August 7 || 3:00pm || Minnesota || ESPN2 || 82-87 (OT) || Jia Perkins (16) || Sylvia Fowles (11) || Dominique Canty (6) || Allstate Arena  4,992 || 12-17
|- align="center" bgcolor="bbffbb"
| 30 || August 10 || 8:00pm || Phoenix ||  || 91-82 || Sylvia Fowles (24) || Sylvia Fowles (14) || YoungCantyThornPrince (4) || Allstate Arena  4,089 || 13-17
|- align="center" bgcolor="ffbbbb"
| 31 || August 14 || 8:00pm || Atlanta || CN100 || 74-98 || Epiphanny Prince (18) || Sylvia Fowles (9) || Epiphanny Prince (4) || Allstate Arena  4,214 || 13-18
|- align="center" bgcolor="bbffbb"
| 32 || August 17 || 7:00pm || @ Atlanta || NBATVFS-S || 84-79 || Sylvia Fowles (18) || Sylvia Fowles (14) || Tamera Young (5) || Philips Arena  5,209 || 14-18
|- align="center" bgcolor="ffbbbb"
| 33 || August 20 || 8:30pm || Connecticut || NBATVCN100 || 71-78 || Epiphanny Prince (19) || Sylvia Fowles (6) || Dominique Canty (7) || Allstate Arena  5,598 || 14-19
|- align="center" bgcolor="ffbbbb"
| 34 || August 21 || 8:00pm || @ Tulsa || NBATVFS-OK || 71-84 || Sylvia Fowles (16) || Sylvia Fowles (7) || Dominique Canty (5) || BOK Center  6,321 || 14-20
|-

| All games are viewable on WNBA LiveAccess

Standings

Statistics

Regular season

Awards and Honors

References

External links

Chicago Sky seasons
Chicago
2010 in sports in Illinois